Ricky Delano Moore (born April 7, 1963) is an American former professional football player who was a running back in the National Football League (NFL). He was selected by the San Francisco 49ers in the third round of the 1985 NFL Draft and also played for the Buffalo Bills, Houston Oilers and Phoenix Cardinals. He played college football for the Alabama Crimson Tide.

References

1963 births
Living people
Sportspeople from Huntsville, Alabama
Players of American football from Alabama
American football fullbacks
American football return specialists
Alabama Crimson Tide football players
Buffalo Bills players
Houston Oilers players
Phoenix Cardinals players
National Football League replacement players